The 2016 Dutch Artistic Gymnastics Championships took place in Rotterdam, Netherlands, from 25-26 June, and it hosted gymnasts from the Netherlands as well as international competitors.

Medalists

References 

2016
2016 in Dutch sport
2016 in gymnastics
International gymnastics competitions hosted by the Netherlands